Strega Nona is a children's picturebook written and illustrated by Tomie dePaola. If considered as a folktale, the story is Aarne-Thompson type 565, the Magic Mill. It concerns Strega Nona ("Grandma Witch" in Italian, though it is actually spelled as nonna) and her helper, Big Anthony. Big Anthony causes the title character's magic pasta pot to create so much pasta that it nearly floods and buries a town. The book, which is likely dePaola's best-known work, was published in 1975 and won a Caldecott Honor in 1976. It was one of the "Top 100 Picture Books" of all time in a 2012 poll by School Library Journal.

Plot
Set in Calabria, in southern Italy, the book focuses on the exploits of Strega Nona.  She is a sort of wise Woman and witch doctor noted throughout her home village for her numerous successful remedies. She helps her fellow villagers with their troubles, most notably by curing headaches, helping single women find husbands, and ridding people of warts.

Because she is getting old, Strega Nona employs the assistance of a young man named Big Anthony to do the household chores. Knowing that he pays little attention, Strega Nona informs Big Anthony of his duties carefully and clearly, adding only one restriction - never to touch her magic pasta pot. Big Anthony complies, but one night he secretly observes Strega Nona singing a spell to the magic pasta pot to produce large amounts of cooked spaghetti noodles; the man is impressed, but unfortunately, he fails to notice that she blows kisses to the pot three times to stop the pasta production.

Big Anthony tries to share his discovery with the townsfolk the next day, but he is laughed at and disbelieved. He vows to one day impress them by making the pasta pot cook by himself. He gets his chance two days later when Strega Nona leaves to visit her friend Strega Amelia and leaves the house in his care. The moment she is gone, Big Anthony gets out the pasta pot and successfully conjures up large amounts of pasta, which he then serves to the townsfolk. However, since Big Anthony cannot stop the pot from cooking, the spaghetti gradually cover Strega Nona's house and nearly floods the entire town. Disaster is averted when Strega Nona returns and immediately blows the three kisses to stop the pot's cooking.

The townsfolk want to lynch Big Anthony, but Strega Nona intervenes, saying "the punishment must fit the crime," and hands a fork to Big Anthony and commands him to eat all of the pasta he has conjured. By nightfall, he is stuffed.

Development

Although the cover and title page of early printings of the book stated that Strega Nona is "an old tale retold and illustrated by Tomie dePaola", in truth dePaola invented the character and the story himself. He wrote the words "Strega Nona" next to a doodle of a woman's head he drew in the early 1970s and later made her the main character in his story based on the Sweet Porridge fairy tale. Later printings of the book bear the accurate subtitle "an original tale written and illustrated by Tomie dePaola".

In the Italian language, the word "strega" means "witch" and the word "nonna" means "grandmother", misspelled as "nona" in the book title. Hence "Strega Nona" means "Grandma Witch". It is clear in the stories, mainly Strega Nona, Her Story, that Nona is the character's actual name.

Other books
Strega Nona and Big Anthony also appear in other books by dePaola, including:
 Big Anthony and the Magic Ring (1979): Introduces Bambolona, "the baker's daughter."
 Strega Nona's Magic Lessons (1982): Big Anthony disguises himself as a girl and takes magic lessons from Strega Nona, who is also teaching Bambolona.
 Merry Christmas, Strega Nona (1986): Strega Nona abandons her usual pursuits in order to prepare a Christmas dinner for the entire town.
 Strega Nona Meets Her Match (1993): Her friend Strega Amelia sets up a modern cure shop which competes with Strega Nona's cure shop.
 Strega Nona—Her Story (1996): Covers Strega Nona's life, telling the readers how she got the magic pasta pot and learned her magic (it all came from the help of her grandmother, Grandma Concetta).
 Big Anthony—His Story (1998): Tells of his life since childhood and how his family noticed that Big Anthony simply does not pay attention.
 Strega Nona Takes a Vacation (2000): Strega Nona goes on vacation and sends gifts of candy and bubble baths to Bambolona and Big Anthony.
 Brava, Strega Nona!: A Heartwarming Pop-Up Book (2008):  Strega Nona gives advice about life.
 Strega Nona's Harvest (2009): Strega Nona teaches Big Anthony about gardening and the importance of order.
 Strega Nona's Gift (2011): Concerns Italian holiday traditions.
 Strega Nona Does It Again (2013): Strega Nona has the perfect remedy for a houseguest who overstays her welcome.

Other media
 Weston Woods Studios produced on January 1, 1977, a short animated film entitled Strega Nonna based on the book, directed by Gene Deitch.
 Thomas Olson and Roberta Carlson adapted Strega Nona, Big Anthony and the Magic Ring, and Strega Nona Her Story as Strega Nona The Musical for the 1986–1987 season of the Children's Theatre Company in Minneapolis. The musical, which went on tour, was also known as "Tomie dePaola’s Strega Nona." 
 Strega Nona, Big Anthony, and Bambolona appeared as supporting characters in the 2001 television series Telling Stories with Tomie dePaola with Strega Nona performed by Bill Barretta and Bambolona performed by Julianne Buescher.

See also 

 The Sorcerer's Apprentice
 Sweet Porridge
 Why the Sea is Salt
 The Master and his Pupil
 The Water Mother
 Bless Me, Ultima

References

1975 children's books
American picture books
Caldecott Honor-winning works
Fictional witches
Fictional characters who use magic
Children's fiction books
Witchcraft in written fiction
Works by Tomie de Paola